Jasem Vishkaei (also Romanized as "Jāsem Vishkaei"; born December 27, 1982, in Bandare Anzali, Gilan Province) is an Iranian karateka.
Vishkaei competed in the 2006 Asian Games in the 75 kg division and won the gold medal. He also won the gold medal in 2010 Asian Games.

Career 
Jassim Vishkaei started karate in 1366 with Mr. Seyedgar in Bandar Anzali and in 1997 he became a member of the Iran national team and during his time in the Iranian national team he won 3 gold medals from the Asian Youth Championships.
3 gold, 2 silver and 1 bronze medal from the U21 World Championship, 2 gold, 2 silver and 2 bronze medal from the Asian Senior Championships.
Vishkaei has also won the gold medal of the Open World Cup, gold, silver and bronze medal of the World Championships, silver medal of Busan Asian Games and gold medal of Doha and Gwangju Asian Games and more than 10 colorful medals from prestigious countries Competitions in the world.

According to many experts in this field, if karate was one of the Olympic disciplines during Jassem's sports career, he should have been awarded at least two gold medals.

Jasem Vishkaei graduated from Bandar Anzali Islamic Azad University with a master's degree in Physical education majoring in physiology.

Coaching records 

 Sweden youth coach 2004
 Sweden U21 and seniors coach  2014-2017

Sports achievements

National

References

External links 
 Jasem Vishkaei profile in SportData
 Jasem Vishkaei Profile in Karate Records

1982 births
Living people
Iranian male karateka
Asian Games gold medalists for Iran
Asian Games silver medalists for Iran
Islamic Azad University, Central Tehran Branch alumni
Asian Games medalists in karate
Karateka at the 2002 Asian Games
Karateka at the 2006 Asian Games
Karateka at the 2010 Asian Games
Medalists at the 2002 Asian Games
Medalists at the 2006 Asian Games
Medalists at the 2010 Asian Games
Islamic Solidarity Games competitors for Iran
People from Bandar-e Anzali
Sportspeople from Gilan province
21st-century Iranian people